Nieuwland is a village in the Dutch province of Utrecht. It is a part of the municipality of Vijfheerenlanden, and lies about 8 km north of Gorinchem.

Nieuwland was a separate municipality in the province of South Holland between 1817 and 1986, when it became part of Zederik. When Zederik merged into the new municipality Vijfheerenlanden in 2019, it became a part of the province of Utrecht.

History 
The village was first mentioned in 1320 as Nuwelant, and means new land (polder). Nieuwland was a stretched out cultivation concession. A church was built near the Geer Vliet. The tower of the Protestant Church dates from the 14th century. The church was extensively restored between 1955 and 1957. In 1840, Nieuwland was home to 245 people.

Gallery

References

Former municipalities of South Holland
Populated places in Utrecht (province)
Vijfheerenlanden